Xiao Zhao or Xiaozhao may refer to:

Xiaozhao (小昭), a fictional character in the novel The Heaven Sword and Dragon Saber
Xiao Zhao (painter), 12th-century Chinese painter
Xiao Zhao (crater), a crater on the planet Mercury